The first season of the American legal comedy-drama Suits originally aired on USA Network in the United States between June 23, 2011 and September 8, 2011.  The season was produced by Hypnotic Films & Television and Universal Cable Productions, and the executive producers were Doug Liman, David Bartis and series creator Aaron Korsh.  

The series revolves around corporate lawyer Harvey Specter and his associate attorney Mike Ross, the latter practicing without a  law degree.  The season had six series regulars playing employees at the fictional Pearson Hardman law firm in Manhattan: Gabriel Macht, Patrick J. Adams, Rick Hoffman, Meghan Markle, Sarah Rafferty, and Gina Torres.

Production 
On April 5, 2010, USA announced that it was developing seven new pilots for its 2010–2011 television season, including A Legal Mind, which would later become Suits.  The premiere was written by Aaron Korsh, and David Bartis and Gene Klein served as executive producers. It was later announced on May 17, 2010 that USA ordered a ninety-minute cast-contingent pilot for the series.  The network later picked up A Legal Mind on January 19, 2011 and ordered eleven one-hour episodes in addition to the 90-minute pilot.

Creator Aaron Korsh, whose Notes from the Underbelly sitcom was canceled during the 2007–2008 Writers' Strike, wrote a spec script intended to be a "half-hour Entourage-type based on my experiences working on Wall Street." He later realized that the project should have hour-long episodes.  Korsh and his agent took the script to several production companies and wanted to give the script to Universal Media Studios.  However, Korsh found it odd that the studio did not want to sell the script to NBC, the network the studio typically worked with.  Korsh's agent convinced USA Network executive Alex Sepiol that although the series was neither a procedural nor what the network typically did, he would like the characters.  Sepiol approved of the script, and by then, Hypnotic Films & Television signed on to the project.  The team pitched the script to USA, which bought the script after the pitch. Korsh did not pitch it to anyone else.  When rewriting the script, Korsh made only small changes to the first half-hour, up to when Mike is hired.  Originally, Mike did not take LSATs for others and only pretends to have attended Harvard, as opposed to pretending he attended Harvard and has a law degree.  Korsh noted that there is no degree or test needed to work on Wall Street and be a mathematical genius, unlike the bar examination in law.  He decided to "embrace" this difference and change the premise.

The pilot episode was filmed in New York City, where the series is set.  The rest of the series is filmed in Toronto, where the sets are built to be identical to the New York law offices seen in the pilot.

To promote the series debut, USA had an advance screening of the pilot on June 2, 2011 at the Hudson River Park and distributed free Häagen-Dazs Sundaes cones at the viewing.  The network also had branded ice cream carts, bikes, and scooters give away the Sundaes and USA/Entertainment Weekly 2011 promotion summer guides on June 22 and June 23 in New York, Los Angeles, Chicago, San Francisco, and Boston to promote the pilot.

Crew 
The season was created by Aaron Korsh and was aired on USA Network in the United States. The season was produced by Hypnotic Films & Television and Universal Cable Productions. The executive producers were Korsh, Doug Liman, and David Bartis. The staff writers were: Korsh with three writing credits; Sean Jablonski, Jon Cowan, Ethan Drogin, and Rick Muirragui with two each; and Erica Lipez with one. The directors throughout the season were Kevin Bray, John Scott, Dennie Gordon, Kate Woods, Terry McDonough, Tim Matheson, Norberto Barba, Felix Alcala, Jennifer Getzinger, and Mike Smith.

Cast

Regular cast
 Gabriel Macht as Harvey Specter
 Patrick J. Adams as Mike Ross
 Rick Hoffman as Louis Litt
 Meghan Markle as Rachel Zane
 Sarah Rafferty as Donna Paulsen
 Gina Torres as Jessica Pearson

Recurring cast
 Tom Lipinski as Trevor Evans
 Vanessa Ray as Jenny Griffith
 Max Topplin as Harold Gunderson

Guest cast
 Rebecca Schull as Edith Ross
 Ben Hollingsworth as Kyle Durant

Six actors received star billing in the show's first season.  Each character works at the fictional Pearson Hardman law firm in Manhattan. Gabriel Macht plays corporate lawyer Harvey Specter, who is promoted to senior partner and is forced to hire an associate attorney.  Patrick J. Adams plays college dropout Mike Ross, who wins the associate position with his eidetic memory and genuine desire to be a good lawyer.  Rick Hoffman plays Louis Litt, Harvey's jealous rival and the direct supervisor of the firm's first-year associates.  Meghan Markle plays Rachel Zane, a paralegal who aspires to be an attorney but her test anxiety prevents her from attending Harvard Law School.  Sarah Rafferty plays Donna Paulsen, Harvey's long-time legal secretary, confidant, and initially the only one at the firm who knows Mike never attended law school.  Rafferty was recommended for the role by Macht, who had been friends with Rafferty for twenty years at the time of production.  When she auditioned for the role, Korsh felt she was best actress for the part. Gina Torres plays Jessica Pearson, the co-founder and managing partner of the firm.

The season also featured several recurring guest stars. Tom Lipinski appeared in four episodes as Mike's drug-dealing best friend Trevor Evans, whose friendship with Mike deteriorates throughout the season.  Vanessa Ray plays Trevor's girlfriend Jenny Griffith in seven episodes. Rebecca Schull plays Edith Ross, Mike's grandmother and caretaker after his parents' deaths, in two episodes. Ben Hollingsworth appears in two episodes as Kyle Durant, Mike's rival and fellow associate, and Max Topplin appears in four episodes as Harold Gunderson, another associate.

Episodes

Ratings 
The pilot episode gained a 1.6 ratings share among adults aged 18–49 and garnered an estimated 4.6 million viewers, making the episode the ninth most watched basic cable show for the week.  The episode was watched 2 million in people aged 18–49 and 2.1 million in people aged 24–54, a double-digit increase over the January premiere of the network's other legal drama Fairly Legal.  The second episode, which aired June 30, experienced a four-tenths ratings drop, which was attributed to the holiday weekend.  However, the episode's ratings were bolstered by a high DVR viewings.  The ratings rose the next week garnering 4.5 million views with a 1.3 ratings share among adults aged 18–49.  The premiere of Jersey Shore, which shares the Thursday 10pm timeslot with Suits, caused a decrease in ratings, a trend that continued for the rest of the season.  Together, Burn Notice and Suits were the top scripted shows in primetime television, and no other network aired scripted series that garnered over four million total viewers, one million viewers aged 25–54, or one million viewers aged 18–49.  Suits was ranked third in males aged 18–49 and males aged 25–54.  The series made USA Network the most watched network in the Thursday 10pm timeslot and gained more total viewers and households than any other scripted series in the timeslot.  The series has the network's third best performing premiere season in viewers aged 18–49, in viewers aged 18–34, and in total viewers.

Home media release

References

External links 
Suits episodes at USA Network
List of Suits season 1 episodes at Internet Movie Database

01
2011 American television seasons